Acraea silia is a butterfly in the family Nymphalidae. It is found on Madagascar.

Description
Very close to Acraea masamba q.v. for differences

Biology
The habitat consists of forests.

Taxonomy
Uncertain species group but see also Pierre & Bernaud, 2014

References

External links

Die Gross-Schmetterlinge der Erde 13: Die Afrikanischen Tagfalter. Plate XIII 56 g

Butterflies described in 1885
silia
Endemic fauna of Madagascar
Butterflies of Africa
Taxa named by Paul Mabille